Samo (died 658) was a Slavic king.

Samo may also refer to:

Music 
Samo (singer) (born 1975), Mexican singer
Samo (Stoja album), 2000
Samo (Nina Kraljić album), 2016

Places 
Samo, Calabria, Italy, a small town and commune
Santa Monica, California, a nickname for the city
20969 Samo, an asteroid - see List of minor planets: 20001–21000

People 
Samo (given name), a list of people
Ravuama Samo (born 1979), Fijian rugby union player
Radike Samo (born 1976), Fijian-Australian rugby union player
Samo (singer) (born 1975), Mexican singer

Other uses 
Samo seed (Echinochloa frumentacea)
SAMO, an abbreviation for superatomic molecular orbital
SAMO, a graffiti tag created by the artist Jean-Michel Basquiat and Al Diaz
Samo people, a sub-ethnic group of the Mandinka people from West Africa
Samo language (Burkina)
Samo language (New Guinea)

See also
Sam'O, reggae singer
Sammo Hung (born 1952), Hong Kong actor, martial artist, film producer and director
Samos (disambiguation)